The Manhasset Stable was the nom de course for an American Thoroughbred horse racing stable established in the early 1930s by Joan Whitney Payson, founder of the New York Mets baseball team and a member of the prominent New York City Whitney family who have been major figures in the sport for more than one hundred years. Joan Payson named the stable for Manhasset, New York where she grew up.

Her daughter, Sandra Helen Payson of Delaplane, Virginia, began using the name again during the mid-1970s when she became involved in Thoroughbred racing. Eddie Gregson trained for Sandra Payson's racing stable on the West Coast of the United States and on the East Coast, James E. Picou and later, Nick Zito.

Manhasset Stable ceased operations following the death of Sandra Payson in 2004. A diamond tiara formerly owned by Sandra Payson, was sold by Sotheby's in 2012.

References

American racehorse owners and breeders
Whitney family residences